This is a list of episodes for Nickelodeon's animated television series, T.U.F.F. Puppy. The first two seasons consist of 26 episodes and the third season consists of 8 episodes, for a total of 60 episodes.

Series overview

Episode list

Season 1 (2010–12) 
This season contained 26 episodes. The season's finale "Lie Like A Dog / Cold Fish" and subsequent seasons were produced in high definition (HD).

Season 2 (2012–14) 
 T.U.F.F. Puppy was picked up for a second season with 26 episodes. All episodes from May 27, 2012 to April 4, 2015 have been produced in high definition.

Season 3 (2014–15) 
 T.U.F.F. Puppy was picked up for a third season.
 All of season three aired on Nicktoons.

References

External links 
 IMDb episode list
 Episode list

Lists of American children's animated television series episodes
Lists of Nickelodeon television series episodes